Niagara may refer to:

Geography

Niagara Falls and nearby places

In both the United States and Canada
Niagara Falls, the famous waterfalls in the Niagara River
Niagara River, part of the U.S.–Canada border
Niagara Escarpment, the cliff over which the river forms the falls
Niagara Whirlpool, a natural whirlpool downstream from the falls
Niagara Gorge, formed by the recession of the falls

United States
 Niagara Falls, New York, the U.S. city adjacent to the falls
 Niagara County, New York
Niagara Falls State Park, the oldest state park in the US
 Niagara Escarpment AVA, New York wine region
 Niagara, New York, a town
 Fort Niagara, near Youngstown, New York
 Niagara Frontier, a region south of Lakes Ontario and Erie
 Buffalo–Niagara Falls metropolitan area
 Buffalo Niagara Region, an economic region

Canada
 Niagara Falls, Ontario, the Canadian city adjacent to the falls
 Niagara-on-the-Lake
 Niagara Peninsula, between Lakes Ontario and Erie
 Niagara (electoral district), a 19th-century federal House of Commons district and historic county
 Regional Municipality of Niagara
 Diocese of Niagara

Other locations

Australia 
 Niagara, Western Australia, an abandoned town in the goldfields

Canada 
 Niagara, British Columbia
 Niagara, Toronto, a neighbourhood 
 Niagara Peak, a mountain 
 Mitchell Lake/Niagara Park, the original name of Cariboo Mountains Provincial Park

United States 
 Niagara, Kentucky
 Niagara, North Dakota
 Niagara, Oregon
 Niagara, Wisconsin
 Niagara (town), Wisconsin

Arts and entertainment
 Niagara (painter and singer) (fl. from 1974), an American punk singer and painter
 Niagara (album) by Red Aim, 2003
 Niagara (band), a French rock band 
 Niagara (board game)
 Niagara (1953 film), a film noir starring Marilyn Monroe
 Niagara (2022 film), a Canadian comedy-drama film
 Niagara: Miracles, Myths and Magic, a 1986 IMAX film 
 "Niagara" (The Office), an episode of the TV series
 Niagara (Frederic Edwin Church), an 1857 painting
 "Niagara", a song by Sara Evans fro the album Restless

Ships
 Niagara (ship), the name of several ships
 Niagara (tug), that sank on Lake Superior in 1904
 Niagara (yacht) a 65-foot sloop built in 1895
 , a Great Lakes steamboat 
 , built in 1814 as Niagara
 , earlier known as HMS Royal George, a British 20-gun wooden sloop 
 USS Niagara, the name of several ships of the U.S. Navy

Other uses
 Niagara (grape)
 Niagara College in Niagara Region, Ontario, Canada
 Niagara University in Niagara County, New York, U.S.
 New York Central Niagara a steam locomotive 
 The Niagara, a historic hotel in Niagara Falls, New York, U.S.

See also

 Nagara (disambiguation)
 Niagara Falls (disambiguation)
 Battle of Niagara (disambiguation)
 Bushkill Falls, also known as "Niagara of Pennsylvania"
 Niagara, Niagara, a 1997 film